Klaas de Vries may refer to:

 Klaas de Vries (Christian Democratic Appeal) (1917–1999), Dutch politician
 Klaas de Vries (Labour Party) (born 1943), Dutch politician
 Klaas de Vries (composer) (born 1944), Dutch composer